Robert Wilson (November 1803May 10, 1870) was a United States senator from Missouri.

Biography
Born near Staunton, Virginia, he moved to Howard County, Missouri in 1820 and taught school. In 1825 he was probate judge of Howard County and was clerk of the circuit and county courts from 1829 to 1840. In 1837 he was appointed brigadier general of the State forces and served during the so-called Mormon War. He studied law, was admitted to the bar and commenced practice in 1840. Wilson moved to Huntsville, Missouri and was a member of the Missouri House of Representatives in 1844; in 1852 he moved to Andrew County, Missouri and in 1854 was a member of the Missouri Senate.

In 1861, Wilson was a Union delegate to the Missouri Constitutional Convention (1861-63) called to determine the attitude on secession in 1861 and was elected vice president of the convention, later acting as president. He was appointed as a Unionist to the U.S. Senate to fill the vacancy caused by the expulsion of Waldo P. Johnson and served from January 17, 1862, to November 13, 1863, when a successor was elected. He engaged in agricultural pursuits and in 1870 he died in Marshall, Missouri. Interment was in Mount Mora Cemetery, St. Joseph, Missouri.

References
 Retrieved on 2009-04-28

1803 births
1870 deaths
Politicians from Staunton, Virginia
Missouri state court judges
Members of the Missouri House of Representatives
Missouri state senators
United States senators from Missouri
People of Missouri in the American Civil War
Missouri lawyers
United States Army generals
Missouri Unconditional Unionists
Missouri Unionists
Unionist Party United States senators
People from Howard County, Missouri
People from Huntsville, Missouri
19th-century American judges
19th-century American lawyers